The 1990 Boston College Eagles football team represented Boston College as an independent during the 1990 NCAA Division I-A football season. The Eagles were led by head coach Jack Bicknell, in his 10th and final season with Boston College, and played their home games at Alumni Stadium in Chestnut Hill, Massachusetts. This was the last season in which Boston College competed as an independent, as the Big East Conference, of which the Eagles were a founding member, began sponsoring football in 1991.

Schedule

References

Boston College
Boston College Eagles football seasons
Boston College Eagles football
Boston College Eagles football